Goredi Chancha is a census town in Nagaur district in the Indian state of Rajasthan.

Demographics
 India census, Goredi Chancha had a population of 9834. Males constitute 53% of the population and females 47%. Goredi Chancha has an average literacy rate of 64%, higher than the national average of 59.5%: male literacy is 75%, and female literacy is 51%. In Goredi Chancha, 16% of the population is under 6 years of age.

References

Cities and towns in Nagaur district